The ITU-T Study Group 13 (SG13) is a statutory group of the ITU Telecommunication Standardization Sector (ITU-T) concerned with networks, infrastructure and cloud computing, including the networking aspects of mobile telecommunications. Examples include: Y.1564, Y.1731, etc.. Recent work includes a series of standards on using machine learning in networking, such as Y.3172, Y.3173, Y.3176, and Y.3181.

Administratively, SG13 is a statutory meeting of the World Telecommunication Standardization Assembly (WTSA), which creates the ITU-T Study Groups and appoints their management teams. The secretariat is provided by the Telecommunication Standardization Bureau (under Director Chaesub Lee).

References 

International Telecommunication Union